Vaqasluy, also rendered as Vaqaslu, also known as Kachalali, may refer to:
 Vaqasluy-e Olya
 Vaqasluy-e Sofla